Alvania balearica is a species of minute sea snail, a marine gastropod mollusk or micromollusk in the family Rissoidae.

Description
The length of the shell attains 2.2 mm.

Distribution
This marine species occurs off the Balearic Islands.

References

External links
 

Rissoidae
Gastropods described in 2009